Quimper Kerfeunteun Football Club, commonly known as Quimper, is a French football team from the city of Quimper, Finistère, who play in the Brittany Football League of the Régional 1, the sixth division of French football. The team used to be known as Stade Quimpérois.

History
The team was founded in 1905. Its major achievement came in the 1970s and 1980s when it played in the Division 2. Its best result was a fourth place in 1988–89. The club had financial problems in 1997. In the 2006–07 season, they escaped from regional level (DH Bretagne, 6th division) and came back at a national level.

The team has a women's section, which played in the 3rd division.

Current squad

Managerial history
 Pierre Philippe: ?-?
 Edmond Lemaître: 1959–1971
 Marcel Mao: 1971–1974
 Robert Dewilder: 1977–1978
 Jean Brélivet: 1978–1979
 Joël Le Bris: 1979–1981
 Marc Rastoll: 1981 – January 1983
 Jacky Castellan: 1983–1984
 Wlodzimierz Lubanski: 1984–1985
 Pierre Garcia: 1985–1987
 Georges Peyroche: 1987–1988
 Pierre Garcia: 1988–1990
 Marc Rastoll: 1990–1993
 Roger Pohon: 1993 – February 1995
 Raymond Kéruzoré: February 1995 – January 1996
 Yvon Leroux: February 1996 – 1996
 Noël Tosi: 1996 – March 1997
 Jean Brélivet and Jean-Paul Thomas: March 1997 – 1997
 Jean-Paul Thomas: March 1997 – 2001
 Pascal Laguiller: 2003 – 2005
 Ronan Salaün: 2005 –

References

External links
 Official site

Association football clubs established in 1905
1905 establishments in France
Sport in Quimper
Football clubs in Brittany